William Mervyn Pickwoad (3 January 1912 – 6 August 1976) was an English actor best known for his portrayal of the bishop in the clerical comedy All Gas and Gaiters, the old gentleman in The Railway Children and Inspector Charles Rose in The Odd Man and its sequels.

Life and career
Mervyn was born in Nairobi, British East Africa, but educated in Britain at Forest School, Snaresbrook, before embarking on a stage career, spending five years in provincial theatre. He made his West End debut in The Guinea Pig at the Criterion Theatre in 1946, before parts in plays such as Lend Me Robin at the Embassy Theatre, the comedy Ring Round the Moon, The Mortimer Touch, A Woman of No Importance by Oscar Wilde at the Savoy Theatre in 1953 and Charley's Aunt.

Mervyn's later stage roles included those of O'Trigger in The Rivals, Lord Greenham in the comedy Aren't We All? and Sir Patrick Cullen in The Doctor's Dilemma. Although he was admired in the theatre, it was with television that he became really well known. One of his first major small screen roles was Sir Hector in the 1962 series Saki. Four years later, he played the Bishop of St. Ogg's in the comedy series All Gas and Gaiters. It was, at that time, breaking with tradition, allowing a laugh at the expense of the established church.

He also played the police chief inspector Charles Rose in the Granada TV series The Odd Man and its spin-offs It's Dark Outside and Mr Rose. He played the Hon. Mr. Justice Campbell in the Granada TV series Crown Court.

Having taken the part of a Chief Inspector in the 1949 Ealing Studios film The Blue Lamp, in which PC George Dixon first appears (only to be shot dead by a young Dirk Bogarde), he then reappeared in a 1960 Dixon of Dock Green episode "The Hot Seat". He was in the 1966 Doctor Who story The War Machines and several Carry On films in the late 1960s, and also appeared as Mr. Whitty in the Randall and Hopkirk (Deceased) episode "A Disturbing Case" in 1969.

Usually cast as a wealthy upper class gentleman, he also appeared in The Railway Children (1970), as the children's train passenger friend, and The Ruling Class (1972). Around the same time, he appeared as Sir Hector Drummond, Bt., in the British TV series The Rivals of Sherlock Holmes, in an episode entitled "The Superfluous Finger" (1973).

Personal life
Mervyn was married to Anne Margaret Payne-Cook, a theatre designer and architect who survived him with their three sons - Michael Pickwoad, who in 2010 became the production designer on Doctor Who, Richard, television director and aerial cameraman and Nicholas (Pickwoad), expert on bookbinding. Mervyn's granddaughter Amy Pickwoad became an art director and standby art director for Doctor Who.

Filmography

Film

Television

Theatre

References

Bibliography
TV Unforgettables – Over 250 Legends of the Small Screen
 Wearing, J.P. (2014). The London Stage 1940 - 1949: A Calendar of Productions, Performers and Personnel. Rowman & Littlefield
 Wearing, J.P. (2014). The London Stage 1950 - 1959: A Calendar of Productions, Performers and Personnel. Rowman & Littlefield

External links

 William Mervyn at BFI
 William Mervyn at Rotten Tomatoes

1912 births
1976 deaths
English male film actors
English male television actors
Kenyan emigrants to the United Kingdom
People from Nairobi
20th-century English male actors
English male stage actors